Montauk State Park is a public recreation area occupying nearly  at the headwaters of the Current River,  southwest of Salem, Missouri. The state park contains a fish hatchery and is noted for its rainbow and brown trout angling. It was acquired in 1926. The park has several natural springs including Montauk Spring with a daily average flow of 53 million gallons of water.

Historic sites

The park includes three resources that were listed on the National Register of Historic Places in 1985:
 Dam and Spillway in the Hatchery Area at Montauk State Park: The stone structure was built in 1935 by Company 1770 of the Civilian Conservation Corps as part of a trout hatchery development project.
 Montauk State Park Open Shelter: The rustic structure was built in 1934-1935 by Company 1770 of the Civilian Conservation Corps. It is an open rectangular structure with an open stone fireplace, low stone dividing walls, and two picnic areas. It features heavy wooden posts and curved struts.
 Old Mill at Montauk State Park: The grist mill was built in 1896 replacing an earlier mill built in 1870.  It was rehabilitated in 1935 by Company 1770 of the Civilian Conservation Corps.  It is a 2-story frame building with a multi-gable roof and stone foundation. It features a central tower-like extension above the second story roof. The Montauk mill is available for tours.  The mill ceased operations in 1927.

Activities and amenities

Missouri trout park season is Mar 1 to Oct 31. The park's fishing area is divided into three zones, each with its own set of regulations. The park has a hatchery, store, cabins, motel rooms, camping area, and trails for hikers and bicyclists.

References

External links

Montauk State Park Missouri Department of Natural Resources
Montauk State Park Map Missouri Department of Natural Resources

State parks of Missouri
State parks of the U.S. Interior Highlands
Protected areas of Dent County, Missouri
Grinding mills in Missouri
Buildings and structures on the National Register of Historic Places in Missouri
Industrial buildings completed in 1896
Protected areas established in 1926
Buildings and structures in Dent County, Missouri
National Register of Historic Places in Dent County, Missouri